Mahindra may refer to:

Business
 Mahindra & Mahindra, an Indian multinational car manufacturing corporation
Mahindra Truck and Bus Division, an Indian commercial vehicle manufacturer owned by Mahindra & Mahindra
 Mahindra Group
Kotak Mahindra Bank, an Indian bank

People
Mahinda (Buddhist monk), the son of Emperor Ashoka and proponent of Buddha's teachings in Sri Lanka
 Mahindu, 10th century Chahamana king of north-western India

Places
Mahindra World City, integrated business cities in India
Mahindra World City, Jaipur, India
Mahindra World City, New Chennai, India
Mountain Mahindra or Three Peaks Mountain, in Indian Himalaya, Himachal Pradesh
Mahendra Mountains, a mountain range described in Indian epics, identified with the Eastern Ghats
Mahendragiri (disambiguation)

Schools
Mahindra École Centrale, a private engineering institute located in Bahadurpally, near Hyderabad, India
UWC Mahindra College or Mahindra United World College of India, an international school near Pune in Maharashtra, India
Mohindra College, an institution of contemporary higher learning in Patiala, Punjab, India

Sports
 Mahindra Hockey Stadium, field hockey stadium at Mumbai, India.
 Mahindra Racing, Indian motorracing team 
 Mahindra United, an Indian football club

People with the surname
Anand Mahindra (born 1955), chairman and managing director of the Mahindra Group
Jagdish Chandra Mahindra (c 1892-1951), Indian industrialist and co-founder of Mahindra & Mahindra in 1945, with K. C. Mahindra and Malik Ghulam Mohammed
Kailash Chandra Mahindra (c. 1894-1963) cofounder of Mahindra & Mahindra
Keshub Mahindra (born 1923), Chairman Emeritus of the Mahindra Group, including Mahindra & Mahindra Limited

See also

Mahindra College (disambiguation)

Mahendra
Mahendru